GTV may refer to:

Media 
GTV (Australia), the Melbourne television station of Australia's Nine Network
GTV (Bangladesh), Bengali language digital cable television channel
GTV (Bulgaria), now bTV Comedy, a cable television channel
GTV (Ghana), the national television broadcaster in Ghana
GTV (Indonesian TV network), a national television network in Indonesia, formerly known as Global TV
GTV (Philippine TV network), a Philippine television network, formerly known as GMA News TV
, a South Korean television channel
GTV Media Group, a media company founded by Steve Bannon and Guo Wengui
Gala Television, a cable television network in Taiwan
Gateway Television, an African television network
Gazi Television, a Bengali language digital cable television channel
Global Tamil Vision, a Tamil language satellite TV channel broadcasting internationally
Government Television, now People's Television Network, a Philippine television network
Gunma Television, a Japanese television station in Gunma Prefecture

Other uses
 Aerogaviota, a Cuban airline
 Alfa Romeo GTV (disambiguation), multiple coupé car
 Alfa Romeo Sprint GT (Veloce), a car from Alfa Romeo